AEL FC may refer to:
 Athlitiki Enosi Larissa F.C., Greek football club
 AEL FC Arena
 AEK Larnaca FC, Cypriot football club
 AEL Limassol, Cypriot football club
 AEL Kalloni F.C., Greek football club